DigiSigner is a cloud-based electronic signature solution focused on ease of use, speed, and affordability. The service enables businesses and individuals to sign documents, and agreements and close deals from anywhere in the world. DigiSigner can be used on various platforms, including laptops, iPhones, iPads, Android, etc.

DigiSigner is compliant with all major e-signature laws including ESIGN, UETA, and European eIDAS. The signatures created with DigiSigner are legally binding and are recognized in court.

History
DigiSigner was created in 2014 by Dmitry Lakhin to provide a flexible, secure, and legally binding e-signature solution and eliminate the need to print, scan, and fax documents. DigiSigner is owned and developed by the company DigiSigner GmbH which operates in Munich, Germany.

External links

Business software companies
PDF software
Freeware